Keiichiro Yamamiya (born July 12, 1972) is a Japanese former professional mixed martial artist. A veteran of 89 fights who began his career in 1996 and last competed in 2015, he fought in the UFC, Pancrase, DEEP, and World Victory Road. He was the inaugural King of Pancrase Light Heavyweight Champion. Yamamiya holds notable decision victories over Chael Sonnen, Nate Marquardt, and Denis Kang.

Mixed martial arts career

Ultimate Fighting Championship
Yamamiya signed with the UFC in 1999. He made his debut against Eugene Jackson at UFC 23 on November 19, 1999, and lost via first-round knockout. Yamamiya was then granted his release to return to Pancrase.

Pancrase
Yamamiya's history with Pancrase goes back his professional debut in 1996, when he faced Satoshi Hasegawa at the 1996 Pancrase Neo-Blood Tournament. He won his debut by split decision. He then lost in the quarter-finals of the tournament, falling to now-MMA legend Yuki Kondo by TKO.

He faced Ryo Kawamura to become the Light Heavyweight King Of Pancrase at Pancrase: Shining 8 on October 1, 2008. He lost via unanimous decision.

On June 5, 2010, Yamamiya challenged Kengo Ura to become the Welterweight King Of Pancrase at Pancrase: Passion Tour 5. He lost the fight via split decision. Yamamiya faced Yuji Hisamatsu at Pancrase 250 on July 28, 2013. Though Yamamiya was the heavy favorite on multiple media scoring websites, Hisamatsu won a majority decision.

DEEP
Yamamiya made his DEEP debut on January 8, 2001, when he faced Paulo Filho at DEEP: 1st Impact. He lost via second-round TKO. He faced Yuki Okano at DEEP: 65 Impact on March 22, 2014. Yamamiya was quickly taken down and submitted with a rear naked choke in the first round.
Yamamiya faced UFC veteran Keita Nakamura at DEEP: 67 Impact on June 22, 2014. He lost the fight via TKO (punches) in the first round, putting Yamamiya at four losses in a row.

Sengoku
Though not currently active for the promotion, Yamamiya signed a contract with Sengoku and made his debut against Alexandre Ribeiro at Sengoku 8 on May 2, 2009. He lost via third-round knockout.

Championships and accomplishments
Pancrase Hybrid Wrestling
Pancrase Light Heavyweight Championship (One time, inaugural champion)
2013 Pancrase Neo Blood Tournament Finalist
2004 Pancrase Neo Blood Tournament Finalist
2000 Pancrase Light Heavyweight Championship Tournament Winner
1997 Pancrase Neo Blood Tournament Winner
1996 Pancrase Neo Blood Tournament Semi-Finalist

Mixed martial arts record

|-
| Loss
| align=center| 45–35–10
| Ikkei Nagamura
| Decision (unanimous)
| Pancrase: 264
| 
| align=center| 3
| align=center| 5:00
| Tokyo, Japan
|
|-
| Loss
| align=center| 45–34–10
| Kenta Takagi
| KO (punch)
| Pancrase: 261
| 
| align=center| 2
| align=center| 0:37
| Tokyo, Japan
|
|-
| Loss
| align=center| 45–33–10
| Keita Nakamura
| TKO (punches)
| DEEP: 67 Impact
| 
| align=center| 1
| align=center| 4:13
| Tokyo, Japan
|
|-
| Loss
| align=center| 45–32–10
| Yuki Okano
| Submission (rear naked choke)
| DEEP: 65 Impact
| 
| align=center| 1
| align=center| 4:53
| Tokyo, Japan
|
|-
| Loss
| align=center| 45–31–10
| Eiji Ishikawa
| Decision (unanimous)
| Grabaka: Grabaka Live! 3
| 
| align=center| 2
| align=center| 5:00
| Tokyo, Japan
|
|-
| Loss
| align=center| 45–30–10
| Yuji Hisamatsu
| Decision (majority)
| Pancrase 250: 2013 Neo-Blood Tournament Finals
| 
| align=center| 2
| align=center | 5:00
| Tokyo, Japan
|
|-
| Win
| align=center| 45–29–10
| Daijiro Matsui 
| Decision (points)
| U-Spirits: U-Spirits Again
| 
| align=center| 1
| align=center| 15:00
| Tokyo, Japan
|
|-
| Loss
| align=center| 44–29–10
| Will Noland
| Decision (unanimous)
| Pancrase 245
| 
| align=center| 3
| align=center| 5:00
| Tokyo, Japan
|
|-
| Win
| align=center| 44–28–10
| Ikkei Nagamura
| KO (flying knee)
| Pancrase: Progress Tour 14
| 
| align=center| 1
| align=center| 1:26
| Tokyo, Japan
|
|-
| Win
| align=center| 43–28–10
| Kenichi Yamamoto
| Decision (unanimous)
| Grabaka: Grabaka Live! 2
| 
| align=center| 2
| align=center| 5:00
| Tokyo, Japan
|
|-
| Loss
| align=center| 42–28–10
| Takenori Sato
| Decision (unanimous)
| Pancrase: Progress Tour 10
| 
| align=center| 3
| align=center| 5:00
| Tokyo, Japan
|
|-
| Win
| align=center| 42–27–10
| Yukinari Tamura
| Decision (majority)
| Pancrase: Progress Tour 1
| 
| align=center| 2
| align=center| 5:00
| Tokyo, Japan
| 
|-
| Win
| align=center| 41–27–10
| Shingo Suzuki
| KO (punches)
| Pancrase: Impressive Tour 13
| 
| align=center| 1
| align=center| 4:24
| Tokyo, Japan
| 
|-
| Win
| align=center| 40–27–10
| Yoshihisa Yamamoto
| Decision (unanimous)
| Grabaka Live: 1st Cage Attack
| 
| align=center| 2
| align=center| 5:00
| Tokyo, Japan
| 
|-
| Win
| align=center| 39–27–10
| Ichiro Kanai
| Decision (majority)
| Pancrase: Impressive Tour 8
| 
| align=center| 2
| align=center| 5:00
| Tokyo, Japan
| 
|-
| Draw
| align=center| 
| Kosei Kubota
| Draw
| Pancrase: Impressive Tour 1
| 
| align=center| 2
| align=center| 5:00
| Tokyo, Japan
| 
|-
| Loss
| align=center| 38–27–9
| Masahiro Toryu
| KO (head kick)
| Pancrase: Passion Tour 11
| 
| align=center| 1
| align=center| 4:51
| Tokyo, Japan
| 
|-
| Win
| align=center| 38–26–9
| Hoon Kim
| Decision (majority)
| Pancrase: Passion Tour 7
| 
| align=center| 2
| align=center| 5:00
| Tokyo, Japan
| 
|-
| Loss
| align=center| 37–26–9
| Kengo Ura
| Decision (split)
| Pancrase: Passion Tour 5
| 
| align=center| 3
| align=center| 5:00
| Tokyo, Japan
| 
|-
| Win
| align=center| 37–25–9
| Takenori Sato
| Decision (majority)
| Pancrase: Passion Tour 3
| 
| align=center| 2
| align=center| 5:00
| Tokyo, Japan
| 
|-
| Loss
| align=center| 36–25–9
| Yuji Hisamatsu
| Decision (majority)
| Pancrase: Passion Tour 1
| 
| align=center| 3
| align=center| 5:00
| Tokyo, Japan
| 
|-
| Win
| align=center| 36–24–9
| Ryuji Ohori
| KO (punch)
| Pancrase: Changing Tour 3
| 
| align=center| 1
| align=center| 1:01
| Tokyo, Japan
| 
|-
| Loss
| align=center| 35–24–9
| Alexandre Ribeiro
| KO (punch)
| World Victory Road Presents: Sengoku 8
| 
| align=center| 3
| align=center| 0:51
| Tokyo, Japan
| 
|-
| Loss
| align=center| 35–23–9
| Ryo Kawamura
| Decision (unanimous)
| Pancrase: Shining 8
| 
| align=center| 3
| align=center| 5:00
| Tokyo, Japan
| 
|-
| Win
| align=center| 35–22–9
| Hiromitsu Kanehara
| Decision (unanimous)
| Pancrase: Shining 5
| 
| align=center| 3
| align=center| 5:00
| Tokyo, Japan
| 
|-
| Win
| align=center| 34–22–9
| Yuki Kondo
| Decision (majority)
| Pancrase: Shining 3
| 
| align=center| 3
| align=center| 5:00
| Tokyo, Japan
| 
|-
| Win
| align=center| 33–22–9
| Ryo Kawamura
| Decision (unanimous)
| Pancrase: Rising 10
| 
| align=center| 3
| align=center| 5:00
| Tokyo, Japan
| 
|-
|  Draw
| align=center| 32–22–9
| Carlos Toyota
| Draw
| MARS 6: Rapid Fire
| 
| align=center| 2
| align=center| 5:00
| Yokohama, Japan
| 
|-
| Loss
| align=center| 32–22–8
| Mikko Rupponen
| Decision (unanimous)
| FF 17: Fight Festival 17
| 
| align=center| 3
| align=center| 5:00
| Helsinki, Finland
| 
|-
| Loss
| align=center| 32–21–8
| Dae Won Kim
| Decision (unanimous)
| DEEP: 20th Impact
| 
| align=center| 2
| align=center| 5:00
| Tokyo, Japan
| 
|-
| Loss
| align=center| 32–20–8
| Nilson de Castro
| Decision (unanimous)
| Pancrase: Spiral 2
| 
| align=center| 3
| align=center| 5:00
| Yokohama, Japan
| 
|-
| Loss
| align=center| 32–19–8
| Gustavo Machado
| Submission (heel hook)
| Pancrase: Brave 11
| 
| align=center| 3
| align=center| 1:20
| Tokyo, Japan
| 
|-
| Win
| align=center| 32–18–8
| Chael Sonnen
| Decision (majority)
| Pancrase: 2004 Neo-Blood Tournament Final
| 
| align=center| 3
| align=center| 5:00
| Tokyo, Japan
| 
|-
| Win
| align=center| 31–18–8
| Kozo Urita
| Decision (unanimous)
| Pancrase: Brave 5
| 
| align=center| 2
| align=center| 5:00
| Tokyo, Japan
| 
|-
|  Draw
| align=center| 30–18–8
| Bret Bergmark
| Draw
| Pancrase: Hybrid 11
| 
| align=center| 3
| align=center| 5:00
| Tokyo, Japan
| 
|-
|  Draw
| align=center| 
| Keith Jardine
| Draw
| Pancrase: Hybrid 8
| 
| align=center| 2
| align=center| 5:00
| Osaka, Japan
| 
|-
| Win
| align=center| 30–18–6
| Nate Marquardt
| Decision (unanimous)
| Pancrase: 2003 Neo-Blood Tournament Second Round
| 
| align=center| 3
| align=center| 5:00
| Tokyo, Japan
| 
|-
| Loss
| align=center| 29–18–6
| Nilson de Castro
| TKO (punches)
| Pancrase: Hybrid 6
| 
| align=center| 1
| align=center| 4:00
| Tokyo, Japan
| 
|-
|  Draw
| align=center| 29–17–6
| Tsuyoshi Kurihara
| Draw
| Pancrase: Hybrid 4
| 
| align=center| 2
| align=center| 5:00
| Tokyo, Japan
| 
|-
| Loss
| align=center| 29–17–5
| Akihiro Gono
| TKO (punches)
| Pancrase: Spirit 9
| 
| align=center| 3
| align=center| 3:49
| Tokyo, Japan
| 
|-
| Win
| align=center| 29–16–5
| Eiji Ishikawa
| Decision (majority)
| Pancrase: 2002 Anniversary Show
| 
| align=center| 3
| align=center| 5:00
| Yokohama, Japan
| 
|-
| Win
| align=center| 28–16–5
| Mitsuyoshi Sato
| TKO (punches)
| Pancrase: 2002 Neo-Blood Tournament Second Round
| 
| align=center| 3
| align=center| 2:52
| Tokyo, Japan
| 
|-
| Win
| align=center| 27–16–5
| Ichiro Kanai
| TKO (punches)
| Pancrase: Spirit 4
| 
| align=center| 1
| align=center| 3:51
| Osaka, Japan
| 
|-
| Win
| align=center| 26–16–5
| Sumio Koyano
| KO (punches)
| Pancrase: Spirit 3
| 
| align=center| 1
| align=center| 0:31
| Tokyo, Japan
| 
|-
| Loss
| align=center| 25–16–5
| Yuki Sasaki
| Submission (armbar)
| Pancrase: Spirit 1
| 
| align=center| 1
| align=center| 4:29
| Tokyo, Japan
| 
|-
| Loss
| align=center| 25–15–5
| Akihiro Gono
| Decision (unanimous)
| Pancrase: Proof 6
| 
| align=center| 3
| align=center| 5:00
| Tokyo, Japan
| 
|-
| Win
| align=center| 25–14–5
| Hikaru Sato
| Decision (unanimous)
| Zero1: Shingeki Chapter 2
| 
| align=center| 2
| align=center| 5:00
| Tokyo, Japan
| 
|-
| Win
| align=center| 24–14–5
| Yoshinori Kawasaki
| TKO (punches)
| Pancrase: 2001 Neo-Blood Tournament Second Round
| 
| align=center| 1
| align=center| 4:04
| Tokyo, Japan
| 
|-
| Loss
| align=center| 23–14–5
| Paulo Filho
| KO (punches)
| DEEP: 1st Impact
| 
| align=center| 2
| align=center| 0:29
| Nagoya, Japan
| 
|-
| Win
| align=center| 23–13–5
| Denis Kang
| Decision (majority)
| Pancrase: Trans 7
| 
| align=center| 2
| align=center| 3:00
| Tokyo, Japan
| 
|-
| Win
| align=center| 22–13–5
| Ikuhisa Minowa
| Decision (unanimous)
| rowspan=2|Pancrase: 2000 Anniversary Show
| rowspan=2|
| align=center| 2
| align=center| 3:00
| rowspan=2|Yokohama, Japan
| 
|-
| Win
| align=center| 21–13–5
| Omar Bouiche
| Submission (guillotine choke)
| align=center| 1
| align=center| 6:46
| 
|-
| Win
| align=center| 20–13–5
| Naohisa Kawamura
| Decision (unanimous)
| Pancrase: Trans 4
| 
| align=center| 1
| align=center| 10:00
| Tokyo, Japan
| 
|-
| Win
| align=center| 19–13–5
| Kousei Kubota
| Decision (majority)
| Pancrase: Trans 4
| 
| align=center| 1
| align=center| 10:00
| Tokyo, Japan
| 
|-
| Win
| align=center| 18–13–5
| Chris Lytle
| Decision (unanimous)
| Pancrase: Trans 1
| 
| align=center| 1
| align=center| 10:00
| Tokyo, Japan
| 
|-
| Loss
| align=center| 17–13–5
| Eugene Jackson
| KO (punch)
| UFC 23
| 
| align=center| 3
| align=center| 3:12
| Tokyo, Japan
| 
|-
| Win
| align=center| 17–12–5
| Leon Dijk
| TKO
| Pancrase: Breakthrough 7
| 
| align=center| 1
| align=center| 2:05
| Tokyo, Japan
| 
|-
| Loss
| align=center| 16–12–5
| Kiuma Kunioku
| Decision (lost points)
| Pancrase: Breakthrough 5
| 
| align=center| 1
| align=center| 15:00
| Nagoya, Japan
| 
|-
| Win
| align=center| 16–11–5
| Yuhi Sano
| TKO (strikes)
| Pancrase: Breakthrough 3
| 
| align=center| 1
| align=center| 10:43
| Tokyo, Japan
| 
|-
|  Draw
| align=center| 15–11–5
| Jeremy Horn
| Draw
| Pancrase: Advance 12
| 
| align=center| 1
| align=center| 15:00
| Tokyo, Japan
| 
|-
| Win
| align=center| 15–11–4
| Jason DeLucia
| Decision (lost points)
| Pancrase: Advance 10
| 
| align=center| 1
| align=center| 15:00
| Tokyo, Japan
| 
|-
| Win
| align=center| 14–11–4
| Satoshi Hasegawa
| Decision (majority)
| Pancrase: 1998 Neo-Blood Tournament Second Round
| 
| align=center| 1
| align=center| 15:00
| Aomori, Japan
| 
|-
| Loss
| align=center| 13–11–4
| Osami Shibuya
| Decision (unanimous)
| Pancrase: 1998 Neo-Blood Tournament Opening Round
| 
| align=center| 1
| align=center| 20:00
| Tokyo, Japan
| 
|-
|  Draw
| align=center| 13–10–4
| Ryushi Yanagisawa
| Draw
| Pancrase: Advance 8
| 
| align=center| 2
| align=center| 3:00
| Kobe, Japan
| 
|-
| Win
| align=center| 13–10–3
| Takafumi Ito
| TKO
| Pancrase: Advance 6
| 
| align=center| 2
| align=center| 1:35
| Tokyo, Japan
| 
|-
| Loss
| align=center| 12–10–3
| Yuki Kondo
| Decision (majority)
| Pancrase: Advance 5
| 
| align=center| 1
| align=center| 20:00
| Yokohama, Japan
| 
|-
| Win
| align=center| 12–9–3
| Minoru Suzuki
| Decision (majority)
| Pancrase: Advance 3
| 
| align=center| 1
| align=center| 20:00
| Kobe, Japan
| 
|-
|  Draw
| align=center| 11–9–3
| Ryushi Yanagisawa
| Draw
| Pancrase: Advance 2
| 
| align=center| 1
| align=center| 10:00
| Yokohama, Japan
| 
|-
| Loss
| align=center| 11–9–2
| Osami Shibuya
| Submission (toe hold)
| Pancrase: Advance 1
| 
| align=center| 1
| align=center| 17:31
| Tokyo, Japan
| 
|-
| Loss
| align=center| 11–8–2
| Bas Rutten
| Submission (rear naked choke)
| Pancrase: Alive 11
| 
| align=center| 1
| align=center| 4:58
| Yokohama, Japan
| 
|-
| Win
| align=center| 11–7–2
| Takafumi Ito
| Decision (unanimous)
| Pancrase: Alive 10
| 
| align=center| 2
| align=center| 3:00
| Kobe, Japan
| 
|-
|  Draw
| align=center| 10–7–2
| Tra Telligman
| Draw
| Pancrase: Alive 9
| 
| align=center| 2
| align=center| 3:00
| Tokyo, Japan
| 
|-
| Win
| align=center| 10–7–1
| Minoru Suzuki
| Decision (lost points)
| Pancrase: 1997 Anniversary Show
| 
| align=center| 1
| align=center| 20:00
| Tokyo, Japan
| 
|-
| Win
| align=center| 9–7–1
| Osami Shibuya
| Decision (1-0)
| Pancrase: Alive 8
| 
| align=center| 2
| align=center| 3:00
| Osaka, Japan
| 
|-
| Win
| align=center| 8–7–1
| Satoshi Hasegawa
| TKO (knees)
| rowspan=2|Pancrase: 1997 Neo-Blood Tournament, Round 2
| rowspan=2|
| align=center| 1
| align=center| 5:50
| rowspan=2|Tokyo, Japan
| 
|-
| Win
| align=center| 7–7–1
| Kousei Kubota
| Decision (lost points)
| align=center| 1
| align=center| 10:00
| 
|-
| Win
| align=center| 6–7–1
| Les Johnston
| Submission (guillotine choke)
| Pancrase: 1997 Neo-Blood Tournament, Round 1
| 
| align=center| 1
| align=center| 4:07
| Tokyo, Japan
| 
|-
| Loss
| align=center| 5–7–1
| Guy Mezger
| Decision (lost points)
| Pancrase: Alive 7
| 
| align=center| 1
| align=center| 15:00
| Hakata, Fukuoka, Japan
| 
|-
|  Draw
| align=center| 5–6–1
| Kiuma Kunioku
| Draw
| Pancrase: Alive 5
| 
| align=center| 1
| align=center| 10:00
| Kobe, Japan
| 
|-
| Win
| align=center| 5–6
| Taka Michinoku
| Submission (keylock)
| Pancrase: Alive 4
| 
| align=center| 1
| align=center| 7:36
| Tokyo, Japan
| 
|-
| Loss
| align=center| 4–6
| Ryushi Yanagisawa
| Decision (lost points)
| Pancrase: Alive 3
| 
| align=center| 1
| align=center| 10:00
| Nagoya, Japan
| 
|-
| Win
| align=center| 4–5
| Takafumi Ito
| Decision (lost points)
| Pancrase: Alive 2
| 
| align=center| 1
| align=center| 15:00
| Tokyo, Japan
| 
|-
| Win
| align=center| 3–5
| Brian Gassaway
| Decision (lost points)
| Pancrase: Alive 1
| 
| align=center| 1
| align=center| 10:00
| Tokyo, Japan
| 
|-
| Win
| align=center| 2–5
| Wes Gassaway
| Decision (unanimous)
| Pancrase: Truth 10
| 
| align=center| 1
| align=center| 10:00
| Tokyo, Japan
| 
|-
| Loss
| align=center| 1–5
| Yoshiki Takahashi
| Submission
| Pancrase: Truth 9
| 
| align=center| 1
| align=center| 7:12
| Kobe, Japan
| 
|-
| Loss
| align=center| 1–4
| Kiuma Kunioku
| Submission
| Pancrase: Truth 8
| 
| align=center| 1
| align=center| 1:38
| Tokyo, Japan
| 
|-
| Loss
| align=center| 1–3
| Katsuomi Inagaki
| Decision (majority)
| rowspan=2|Pancrase: 1996 Anniversary Show
| rowspan=2|
| align=center| 1
| align=center| 10:00
| rowspan=2|Tokyo, Japan
| 
|-
| Loss
| align=center| 1–2
| Osami Shibuya
| Submission
| align=center| 1
| align=center| 6:48
| 
|-
| Loss
| align=center| 1–1
| Yuki Kondo
| TKO
| Pancrase: 1996 Neo-Blood Tournament, Round 2
| 
| align=center| 1
| align=center| 6:16
| Tokyo, Japan
| 
|-
| Win
| align=center| 1–0
| Satoshi Hasegawa
| Decision (split)
| Pancrase: 1996 Neo-Blood Tournament, Round 1
| 
| align=center| 1
| align=center| 10:00
| Tokyo, Japan
|

References

External links
 
 

Living people
1972 births
Japanese male mixed martial artists
Welterweight mixed martial artists
Middleweight mixed martial artists
Light heavyweight mixed martial artists
Mixed martial artists utilizing kickboxing
Mixed martial artists utilizing wrestling
People from Chigasaki, Kanagawa
Ultimate Fighting Championship male fighters